Kituba is a small genus of central African ground spiders. It was first described by B. V. B. Rodrigues and C. A. Rheims in 2020, and it has only been found in the Democratic Republic of the Congo.  it contains only two species: K. langalanga and K. mayombensis.

See also
 List of Gnaphosidae species

References

Gnaphosidae genera
Arthropods of the Democratic Republic of the Congo
Endemic fauna of the Democratic Republic of the Congo